Margarethe Sömmering, born Margarethe Elisabeth Grunelius (1768–1802) was a German painter.

Born in Frankfurt, Sömmering was the sister of a banker, and in 1792 married Samuel Thomas von Sömmering, who at the time was dean of the medical faculty at the University of Mainz. The couple moved to Frankfurt three years later. She also produced engravings after Francesco Bartolozzi and Johann Heinrich Wilhelm Tischbein.

References

1768 births
1802 deaths
German women painters
German engravers
Women engravers
18th-century German painters
18th-century engravers
18th-century German women artists
19th-century German painters
19th-century engravers
19th-century German women artists
Artists from Frankfurt